Glen Clifford Housman (born 3 September 1971) is an Australian former distance freestyle swimmer of the 1980s and 1990s, who won the silver medal in the 1500-metre freestyle, swimming at the 1992 Summer Olympics.  His career was overshadowed by fellow Australian Kieren Perkins, and was also marred by illness.

Housman entered the international stage after winning the 400-, 800- and 1500-metre freestyle events at the 1989 Australian championships, gaining selection for the Pan Pacific Championships in Tokyo, where he claimed gold in the 1500-metre event.  He continued to improve, breaking the 1500-metre world record in Adelaide at the Australian trials for the 1990 Commonwealth Games in Auckland.  However, this record was disallowed as the electronic timing equipment failed as he touched the finishing wall, even though he was clearly ahead of the world record as he touched. Housman proceeded to win a gold and silver in the 1500- and 400-metre freestyle events respectively in Auckland.

In 1991, Housman was struck down by illness, and was forced to sit on the sidelines as Perkins claimed the 1500-metre freestyle world record.  He returned at the 1992 Summer Olympics, where despite swimming a fine race, he was completely overshadowed as Perkins swept all before him.  Housman was once again absent in 1993 due to illness, returning to the pool for the 1994 Commonwealth Games only to finish 3rd in the 1500-metre freestyle, trailing Perkins and Daniel Kowalski.  He also won gold in the 4×200-metre freestyle relay.

Housman's final international campaign at the 1996 Summer Olympics was a disappointment.  He missed out on selection for the 1500-metre behind Perkins and Kowalski, and was relegated to the role of a heat swimmer for the 4×200-metre freestyle relay team, which later finished fourth.

Awards
 1990 – Australian Swimmer of the Year

Personal life

Housman married Jodie Clatworthy, a fellow Australian swimmer who competed at the 1988 Olympics.

See also
 List of Commonwealth Games medallists in swimming (men)
 List of Olympic medalists in swimming (men)

References

External links
 http://sportsillustrated.cnn.com/vault/article/magazine/MAG1069392/index.htm
 http://www.news.com.au/couriermail/story/0,23739,23666425-5012448,00.html

1971 births
Living people
Australian male freestyle swimmers
Olympic swimmers of Australia
Swimmers at the 1992 Summer Olympics
Swimmers at the 1996 Summer Olympics
Sportspeople from Rockhampton
Australian Swimmers of the Year
Medalists at the 1992 Summer Olympics
Swimmers at the 1990 Commonwealth Games
Swimmers at the 1994 Commonwealth Games
Commonwealth Games gold medallists for Australia
Olympic silver medalists for Australia
Olympic silver medalists in swimming
Commonwealth Games medallists in swimming
20th-century Australian people
Medallists at the 1990 Commonwealth Games
Medallists at the 1994 Commonwealth Games